Tam O'Shanter Ridge is a mostly residential neighbourhood in the Dartmouth area of Halifax Regional Municipality, Nova Scotia. It is located in the east end of Dartmouth on the outer fringe of Westphal, north of Commodore Park.

History 

Tam O'Shanter Ridge was established as a subdivision in 1960 by the Commodore Development Company, with houses ready for occupancy by 1961.

References 

Communities in Halifax, Nova Scotia
Dartmouth, Nova Scotia